Rosemont is a neighborhood in Bryn Mawr, Pennsylvania, United States, on the Philadelphia Main Line. It is located in Lower Merion Township, Montgomery County. It is best known as the home of Rosemont College.

Rosemont is served by its own stops on both the Paoli/Thorndale Line of SEPTA Regional Rail and the Norristown High Speed Line.

The community of Garrett Hill is in Radnor Township and in the Rosemont section.

History
The Joseph Sinnott Mansion was listed on the National Register of Historic Places in 1980.

The neighborhood of "Beaupre" in Rosemont was once the 200-acre estate of the same name, built for Alexander Cassatt's son, Robert. The original mansion now is part of The Mansion at Rosemont, a senior living community that is part of the nonprofit organization Human Good. The original French iron gates flank entrances from Conestoga Road and South Ithan Avenue.

Education

Primary and secondary schools

Public schools
Pupils living in the Radnor Township portion of Rosemont attend schools in Radnor Township School District, while students in the Lower Merion Township portion attend schools in the Lower Merion School District.

Until 1980, the Radnor Township, Delaware County portion of the community was served by Rosemont Elementary School, located in the Garret Hill neighborhood of the town.  The Rosemont Business Campus now stands on the former elementary school site.  Children in these neighborhoods are now bused to the Radnor Elementary School.

Private schools
Holy Child School at Rosemont (formerly Rosemont School of the Holy Child), located in Rosemont and in Lower Merion Township, is neither affiliated with nor governed by the Roman Catholic Archdiocese of Philadelphia. The school is adjacent to Rosemont College.

The Agnes Irwin School is located on Ithan Avenue in Rosemont. It is an all-girl, non-sectarian, day school for PreK-Grade 12 founded by Miss Agnes Irwin and her sister Sofie.

The Roman Catholic Saint Thomas of Villanova Parish run by the Augustinian Order also ran a parochial school, which closed in the 1980s, adjacent to their Rosemont chapel and serving the Rosemont community.

Colleges and universities
Rosemont College is in Rosemont on Montgomery Avenue at Curwen Road.

Parks
Rosemont is home to the following parks:
 Ashbridge Memorial Park (Lower Merion Township)
 Austin Memorial Park (Lower Merion Township)
 Emlen Tunnell Park (Radnor Township)
 Clem Macrone Park (Radnor Township)
 Unkefer Park (Radnor Township)

References

Philadelphia Main Line
Radnor Township, Delaware County, Pennsylvania
Lower Merion Township, Pennsylvania
Unincorporated communities in Delaware County, Pennsylvania
Unincorporated communities in Pennsylvania